Aao Pyaar Karen is a 1994 Indian Hindi-language romantic drama film directed by Ravindra Peepat, starring Saif Ali Khan Somy Ali and Shilpa Shetty. It is a remake of the 1992 Tamil film Chembaruthi.

Plot

Anjali Devi (Bharati) is a rich businesswoman who lives by herself in a palatial mansion. She is attended by a number of people including Sampat Rai (Prem Chopra), her business manager, and Chhaya (Shilpa Shetty), a girl from the local village. Chhaya was raised by Anjali Devi and the two are very fond of each other. One day Anjali Devi receives a telegram intimating that her grandson Raja (Saif Ali Khan) is coming to visit her from London. It is revealed that Anjali Devi's only son married against her husband's wishes and was subsequently thrown out of the house. At his deathbed her husband made Anjali Devi promise that she wouldn't let their son or his family cross the threshold of their house. Anjali Devi's son and daughter in law later pass away in an accident, but bound by the promise to her dying husband, Anjali Devi repudiates Raja when he comes to see her. Chhaya advises Raja to set up a tent outside the house and slowly win over his grandmother. The plan succeeds and eventually Anjali Devi accepts him. Raja and Chhaya fall in love and decide to get married. In the meantime Sampat Rai, who had hoped to inherit her business, is furious at Raja's arrival in Anjali Devi's life. He decides to set up his daughter Sonu (Somy Ali) with Raja. Sonu and Raja become good friends. Anjali Devi too agrees to their marriage. However, Raja refuses to marry Sonu and tells Anjali Devi that he loves Chhaya. Anjali Devi is furious at the thought of her grandson marrying down into a poor family and has Sampat Rai throw Chhaya out. Chhaya's brother Shankar (Mukesh Khanna) takes her back home. He too is furious that she fell in love with Raja and vows to get her married to the ultra creepy Maniram (Gulshan Grover). He locks up Chhaya to stop her from meeting Raja. When Raja tries to find Chhaya he is beaten up by Maniram. Eventually Chhaya and Raja run away with the aid of Shankar's wife. Maniram, Shankar, and Sampat Rai find out and pursue the couple. Before they catch up with the runaways, the latter get married in a temple. Shankar and Anjali Devi decide to forgive them.  However, Maniram with the help of Sampat Rai kidnaps Chhaya and Raja and takes them to Sampat's Rai's abandoned factory. Sampat Rai in the meantime also kidnaps Anjali Devi and takes her there. He tortures her into signing over her property to Sampat Rai. Shankar finds his way to the factory and helps Chhaya and Raja fight Maniram and Sampat Rai. Sonu too has followed her father to the factory. She tries to free Anjali Devi but is killed herself in the process. Sampat Rai breaks down when he realizes that he has accidentally killed his own daughter. Just then the police arrive and arrest the goons. In the end Anjali Devi, Raja, and Chhaya are reunited.

Cast
Saif Ali Khan ... Raja
Shilpa Shetty ... Chhaya
Somy Ali ...Sonu S. Rai
Aparajita ...Sampat's wife
Gajendra Chauhan ...Suraj
Rakesh Bedi ...Pandit Kashiram
Bharati ...Anjali
Prem Chopra ...Sampat Rai
Gulshan Grover ...Maniram
Mukesh Khanna ...Shankar
Shashi Kiran
Rajesh Puri ...Bakshish
Himani Shivpuri ...Shankar's wife
Subbiraj ...Anjali's husband
Tiku Talsania ...Tikuram

Soundtrack
The music was composed by Aadesh Shrivastava and released by BMB Music Company. All lyrics were written by Shyam Raj.

References

External links
 

1994 films
1994 romantic drama films
1990s Hindi-language films
Hindi remakes of Tamil films
Films scored by Aadesh Shrivastava
Hindi-language romance films
Indian romantic drama films